{{Infobox officeholder
| name = Sun Yu
| native_name = 孫瑜
| image = 
| image_size = 
| caption = 
| alt = 
| office = Administrator of Danyang (丹楊太守)
| term_start = 
| term_end = 
| term_start1 = 
| term_end1 = 
| office2 = General of Vehement Might (奮威將軍)
| term_start2 = 
| term_end2 = 
| birth_date = 177
| death_date = 215 (aged 38)
| relations = See Eastern Wu family trees
| father = Sun Jing
| children = 
| occupation = General
| blank1 = Courtesy name
| data1 = Zhongyi (仲異)
}}

Sun Yu (177–215), courtesy name Zhongyi, was a cousin of Sun Quan, a Chinese warlord who lived during the late Eastern Han dynasty and later became the founding emperor of the state of Eastern Wu in the Three Kingdoms period. Sun Yu was the second son of Sun Jing, the youngest brother of Sun Quan's father Sun Jian.

Family

See also
 Lists of people of the Three Kingdoms

Notes

References

 Chen, Shou (3rd century). Records of the Three Kingdoms (Sanguozhi).
 Pei, Songzhi (5th century). Annotations to Records of the Three Kingdoms (Sanguozhi zhu'').

Generals under Sun Quan
177 births
215 deaths
Political office-holders in Anhui
Officials under Sun Quan